Ameghiniella is a genus of fungi in the family Cordieritidaceae. The genus contains 2 species.

References

Leotiomycetes
Leotiomycetes genera
Taxa described in 1887

Taxa named by Carlo Luigi Spegazzini